Edwin Fernando Vente Banguera (born 12 August 1996) is a Colombian professional footballer who plays as a leftback for Portuguese club Mafra.

Club career
Banguera made his professional debut with Gil Vicente in a 3-2 Taça da Liga win over Aves on 3 August 2019.

On 30 July 2021, he signed with Felgueiras.

References

External links
 
 ZeroZero Profile

1996 births
Living people
Footballers from Cali
Colombian footballers
Association football fullbacks
S.C. Salgueiros players
Gil Vicente F.C. players
S.C. Covilhã players
F.C. Felgueiras 1932 players
Primeira Liga players
Liga Portugal 2 players
Campeonato de Portugal (league) players
Colombian expatriate footballers
Expatriate footballers in Portugal
Colombian expatriate sportspeople in Portugal